Farrukhabad Gharana is one of six prominent playing styles or gharanas of North Indian tabla , in Hindustani classical music, and derives its name from Farrukhabad in Uttar Pradesh state.

History
The Farrukhabad Gharana of Tabla was created in the 11th Century by a Rajput Court musician Akaasa who later had to convert to Islam and became a Muslim (Dastaan-e-akasa). He also changed his name from Akaasa to Mir Akaasa. He was the first to introduce bols into tabla playing. The first bols introduced in tabla were "TAT-DHIT-THUN-NAN".
Mir Akaasa died in the year 1189 AD (Need Citation). He was succeeded by nine sons and one daughter. He passed on his legacy to his eldest son, Ustad Bilawal Khan, who in turn passed the torch of the gharana to Ustad Ali Baksh (famous for his kran bols). This tradition continued till the 26th descendant, Ustad Haji Vilayat Ali Khan (1779-1826). It was he who named this ‘gharana’ after the province in which he used to live viz. Farrukhabad. Ustad Haji Vilayat Ali Khan (1779-1826) gave this gharana the name of the province where he used to live, which was Farukkabad.

Ustad Haji Vilayat Khan  got the title of Haji after his completion of 7 haj ( Islamic pilgrimage). Vilayat Khan got famous after his famous battle of Tabla gats with Ustad Salaali Khansaheb, who has challenged Ustad Bakshu Khansaheb of Lucknow gharana, In order to save his pride Bakshu Khansaheb requested Vilayat Khan, who was also Salaali Khansaheb's uncle, to fight the battle of tabla Gats with Ustad Salaali Khansaheb. This battle continued for almost 15 days where many gats (authentic composition of the gharanas) and jodas (pairs of such compositions) were exchanged. On the 15th day Vilayat Khan played a unique Gat (Gat of Gazi) whose joda (pair) Ustad Salari Khansaheb could not produce. Thus Vilayat Khan was declared the winner. Ustad Bakshu Khansaheb as a reward got Vilayat Khan married to his daughter and reputedly gave him 500 tabla compositions (although some sources say only 12 compositions). Vilayat Khan on the other hand gave Salaali Khansaheb his daughter in marriage and along with that he gave 14 authentic Gats known as jahezi gats to Ustad  Salaali Khan as dowry.

Ustad Haji Vilayat Khan's sons, Hussain Ali Khan & Amaan Ali Khan became Tabla artist of repute. Amaan Ali Khan in his old age suffered from some contagious disease. His family members neglected him at that time. At that he left for Jaipur and decided to educate others instead of his own family members. Pandit Jailal Misra, eminent kathak performer & teacher, "grabbed this opportunity. He took lot of care of Ustad and Ustad trained him wholeheartedly."

The lineage of Farrukhabad is still carried on by the descendants of This Gharana. The Present Khalifa (head) of this Gharana is the great tabla exponent Ustad Aslam Faqir Hussain Khan  who is the 33rd generation of this Gharna 
    
There is a huge variety in the repertoire of compositions, owing to the tremendous and creative output of great composers such as Haji Vilayat Ali Khan and Amir Hussain Khan, nephew of Munir Khan, himself a disciple of Nisar Hussain Khan. In addition, a large number of gats (compositions).

Repertoire
The Farrukhabad gharana is among the oldest gharanas (i.e. schools) of Tabla, the other one being Delhi Gharana. It belongs to the wider "Purbi Baj", or "eastern way of playing", which regroups Lucknow, Farrukhabad and Ajrada styles. Hence it is characterized by an extensive use of resonant strokes played on the sur of the daya reminding the Pakhawaj, but also, in the case of Farrukhabad gharana, by delicate strokes.

The repertoire is replete with a varied and intriguing compositions, makes great use of open resonant baya strokes, and contains many unique stroke combinations. There is a greater wealth and emphasis of gats, chalan, and rela compositions than on qaida or peshkar. There is a prominent use of certain bols, notably DhereDhere/KitaTaka/TakitaDha.

.

Exponents

19th Century
 Vilayat Ali Khan (1779-1826), co-founder of Farukhabad gharana. Son-in-law and disciple of Miyan Bakshu Khan of Lucknow gharana.
 Hussein Ali Khan, son and disciple of Vilayat Ali Khan.
 Choodiyanwale Imam Baksh, disciple of Vilayat Ali Khan. Noted pakhawaj player.
 Nesar Hussain Khan (1824-1877), son and disciple of Vilayat Ali Khan.
 Salari Khan, disciple of Vilayat Ali Khan.
 Mubarak Ali Khan, disciple of Vilayat Ali Khan.
 Channu Khan, disciple of Vilayat Ali Khan.
 Karam Ittal Khan, disciple of Vilayat Ali Khan. Brother of Ilaahi Baksh.
 Ilaahi Baksh, disciple of Vilayat Ali Khan. Brother of Karam Ittal Khan.
 Nanhe Khan (1847-1902), son and disciple of Nesar Hussain Khan.
 Munir Khan (1863-1937), disciple of Hussein Ali Khan. Also learned from his father, Kaale Khan, and other maestros. Regarded as founding a sub-branch, "Laliana Gharana."
 Masidullah "Masit" Khan (1872-1974), son and disciple of Nanhe Khan.
 Faiyaz Khan Moradabadi, son and disciple of Karam Ittal Khan. Maternal uncle of Ahmed Jan Thirakwa

20th Century
 Ahmed Jan Thirakwa (1892-1976), disciple of paternal uncle, Sher Khan of Lucknow gharana, maternal uncle, Faiyaz Khan Moradabadi, and Munir Khan.
 Shamsuddin Khan (1890-1968), disciple of Faiyaz Khan Moradabadi, MUnir Khan, and Tega Jaffer Khan of Delhi gharana.
 Amir Hussain Khan (1899-1969), disciple of maternal uncle, Munir Khan.
 Azeem Baksh Khan, disciple of Nanhe Khan and Masit Khan.
 Subraimama Ankolekar, disciple of Munir Khan.
 Raichand Boral (1903-1981), disciple of Masit Khan. Best known as a film music composer.
 Jagannathbuwa Purohit (1904-1968), disciple of Ahmed Jan Thirakwa. Primarily known as a vocalist of the Agra gharana.
 Jnan Prakash Ghosh (1909-1997), disciple of Masit Khan. Also learned from Firoz Khan of Punjab gharana.
 Vinayakrao Ghangrekar, disciple of Subraimama Ankolekar.
 Pandharinath Nageshkar (1913-2008), disciple of Subraimama Ankolekar, Amit Hussain Khan, and Ahmed Jan Thirakwa.
 Montu Bannerjee (1915-1980s), disciple of Jnan Prakash Ghosh and Masit Khan. Also learned from Abid Hussain Khan of Lucknow gharana, an Natthu Khan. Primarily a harmonium player.
 Taranath Rao (1915-1991), disciple of Shamsuddin Khan. Also learned from Khaprumama Parvatkar and others.
 Karamatullah Khan (1917-1977), son and disciple of Masit Khan.
 Nikhil Ghosh (1918-1995), disciple of Jnan Prakash Ghosh, Amir Hussain Khan, and Ahmed Jan Thirakwa.
 Lalji Gokhale (1919-2002), disciple of Ahmed Jan Thirakwa. Also learned from Malan Khan and Fakir Khan of Punjab gharana and Habibuddin Khan of Delhi gharana.
 Kanai Dutta (1925-1977), disciple of Jnan Prakash Ghosh. Also learned from Satish Das.
 Nizamuddin Khan (1927-2000), son and disciple of Azeem Baksh Khan.
 Ravi Bellare (1927-2005), disciple of maternal uncle Taranath Rao.
 Bhai Gaitonde (1932-2019), disciple of Jagannathbuwa Purohit, Ahmedjan Thirakwa, and Vinayakrao Ghangrekar.
 Pt. Sudhakar Paithankar, Disciple of Late Pt. Narayanbuva Joshi (1937 - Present)
 Arvind Mulgaonkar (1937-2018), disciple of Amir Hussain Khan.
 Babasaheb Mirajkar, disciple of Amir Hussain Khan.
 Shyamal Bose (1934-2003), disciple of Jnan Prakash Ghosh. Also learned from Lakshmi Prasad Mishra of Benares gharana, Firoz Khan of Punjab gharana, and Anath Nath Bose.
 Shankar Ghosh (1935-2016), disciple of Jnan Prakash Ghosh. Also learned from Firoz Khan, Anath Nath Bose, and Sudarshan Adhikari.
 Suresh Talwalkar (b. 1948), disciple of Vinayakrao Ghangrekar and Pandarinath Nageshkar.
 Sanjay Mukherjee
 Swapan Siva (b. 1951), disciple of Karamatullah Khan.
 Anindo Chatterjee (b. 1954), disciple of Jnan Prakash Ghosh.
 Vibhav Nageshkar (b. 1955), son and disciple of Pandharinath Nageshkar.
 Nayan Ghosh (b. 1956), son and disciple of Nikhil Ghosh.
 Sabir Khan (b. 1959), son and disciple of Karamatullah Khan.
 Abhijit Banerjee (b. 1964), disciple of Jnan Prakash Ghosh. Also learned from Tushar Kanti Bose and Manik Pal.
 Bickram Ghosh (b. 1966), son and disciple of Pt. Shankar Ghosh.
 Tanmoy Bose (b. 1963), disciple of Pt. Shankar ghosh and Pt. Kanai Dutta. He also learned vocals from pandit Maharaj Banerjee and Harmonium from Pandit Mantu Bannerjee
 Subhankar Banerjee (1966-2021), disciple of Swapan Siva.
 Vishwanath Shirodkar (b. 1960s), disciple of Suresh Talwalkar, Vibhav Nageshkar, and Nayan Ghosh.
 Biswajit Deb (b.1959),disciple of late prabir Bhatacharya of farukabad gharana.

21st Century
 Satyajit Talwalkar (b. 1970s), son and disciple of Suresh Talwalkar.
 Savani Talwalkar (b. 1980s), daughter and disciple of Suresh Talwalkar.
 Anubrata Chatterjee (b. 1985), son and disciple of Anindo Chatterjee.
 Rimpa Siva (b. 1986), daughter and disciple of Swapan Siva.
 Ariff Khan (b.1988), son and disciple of Sabir Khan (present khalifa of Farukhabad Gharana)
 Asif Khan (b.1990), son and disciple of Sabir Khan (present khalifa of Farukhabad Gharana)
 Ameen Khan (b.1992), son and disciple of Sabir Khan (present khalifa of Farukhabad Gharana)
 Ishaan Ghosh (b. 2000), son and disciple of Nayan Ghosh.

References

Tabla gharanas
Farrukhabad
Music of Uttar Pradesh